Aronson v Lewis, 473 A.2d 805 (Del. 1984), is a US corporate law case, from Delaware concerning the possibility of a shareholder to bring a derivative suit.

Facts
A shareholder claimed that the directors of Meyers Parking System Inc. had improperly wasted corporate assets. The CEO, Mr Fink, then 75 years old, was also a 47% shareholder and its founder. It was alleged he personally selected the other directors. They had given to Mr Fink a generous five year employment contract, a subsequent term as a consultant with a large salary, and an annual bonus equal to 5% of the company's pre tax profits. The contract also said that this continued regardless of Mr Fink's continued ability to perform the job.

Judgment
Justice Moore rejected the claim on the ground that the plaintiff had not shown that making a demand on the board would have been futile. He held that the 'business judgment rule' was applicable. This meant,

See also

United States corporate law
UK company law

References

External links
 

United States corporate case law
Delaware state case law
1984 in Delaware
1984 in United States case law